In mathematics, concavification is the process of converting a non-concave function to a concave function. A related concept is convexification – converting a non-convex function to a convex function. It is especially important in economics and mathematical optimization.

Concavification of a quasiconcave function by monotone transformation 
An important special case of concavification is where the original function is a quasiconcave function. It is known that:
 Every concave function is quasiconcave, but the opposite is not true.
 Every monotone transformation of a quasiconcave function is also quasiconcave.
Therefore, a natural question is: given a quasiconcave function , does there exist a monotonically increasing  such that  is concave?

Positive and negative examples 
As a positive example, consider the function  in the domain . This function is quasiconcave, but it is not concave (in fact, it is strictly convex). It can be concavified, for example, using the monotone transformation , since  which is concave.

A negative example was shown by Fenchel. His example is: . He proved that this function is quasiconcave, but there is no monotone transformation  such that  is concave.

Based on these examples, we define a function to be concavifiable if there exists a monotone transformation that makes it concave. The question now becomes: what quasiconcave functions are concavifiable?

Concavifiability 
Yakar Kannai treats the question in depth in the context of utility functions, giving sufficient conditions under which continuous convex preferences can be represented by concave utility functions. 

His results were later generalized by Connell and Rasmussen, who give necessary and sufficient conditions for concavifiability. They show an example of a function that violates their conditions and thus is not concavifiable. They prove that this function is strictly quasiconcave and its gradient is non-vanishing, but it is not concavifiable.

References 

Convex analysis